ARTV, also known as Canal Parlamento, is a Portuguese legislature television station that broadcast events from the Assembly of the Republic.

History

The channel launched in 1998 as Canal Parlamento, before renaming to its current name in September 2002, with Canal Parlamento being only a subtitle in the channel's logo.

Terrestrial trials were conducted on December 27, 2012 and regular transmission commenced on January 3, 2013. The channel runs as a limited service.

External links
 Official website 

24-hour television news channels in Portugal
2004 establishments in Portugal
Legislature broadcasters
Portuguese-language television stations
Television channels and stations established in 2004